The Christian–Patterson Rental Property is a two-story, Italianate house built about 1890 in Eugene, Oregon. The house was constructed by Daniel Christian as a rental property for his daughter, Ethenda. Sarah Patterson, another of Christian's daughters, purchased the property in 1903. Patterson had married Abram S. Patterson, an early Eugene mayor, merchant, and postmaster.

A survey of historic resources in the West University Neighborhood found 339 residential structures, but only five of them were historic and in the Italianate style.

See also
 National Register of Historic Places listings in Lane County, Oregon

References

External links
 Lane County historical Society

1890 establishments in Oregon
Houses completed in 1890
Houses on the National Register of Historic Places in Eugene, Oregon
Italianate architecture in Oregon